Kamel Daoudi (born August 3, 1974, in Algeria) is a French-Algerian convicted for plotting to blow up a US embassy in Paris in June 2001, who was later deported from London by the UK Border Agency. He pleaded guilty in a French court after his deportation and was sentenced to nine years in jail. He has been consequently stripped of French citizenship and the French government tried to deport him to Algeria, which was refused by the European Court of Human Rights.

Life 
His father worked in France. In 1979, the entire family emigrated from Algeria to France to have a better life. Daoudi grew up in a middle-class suburb apartment of Paris and was considered a good student in school. After the end of 1992, when the civil war erupted in Algeria, Daoudi began to help the French government as France wanted to prevent Algeria from becoming an Islamic country.
In the early 1990s, Daoudi’s family suffered from income reductions and moved to a lower-class suburb, which made him very bitter about French society. He joined the Takfir wal-Hijra group led by Algerian Djamel Beghal. Later, Daoudi graduated in Paris as a computer engineer and a computer expert and ran a French government-subsidized computer Internet cafe in a Paris suburb.
In 2000 and 2001, Daoudi went through training in Al Qaeda’s training camps in Afghanistan and was qualified in handling explosives to bomb.

Arrest and trial 
Daoudi was arrested on September 29, 2001, by the British police in connection with the US Paris Embassy plot, after he was deported from London, where he was detained, on September 25, 2001, following the arrest of Brahim Benmerzouga and Baghdad Meziane. According to the indictment, he used the Internet café in Paris to communicate with Al Qaeda and was supposed to assemble the car bomb for the US embassy attack.
Daoudi’s trial, alongside five more defendants in the US Paris Embassy case, began  on January 4, 2005, in Paris, France. On March 15, 2005, Daoudi was convicted on all charges against him in a Paris court and was sentenced to nine years in jail.

References

External links

 CNN Article about four men found not guilty
 Article about Trabelsi arrested
 Large Europe Al-Qaida network stopped
 Guardian.co.uk information about Paris plot

Islamic terrorism in France
Algerian Muslims
1974 births
Living people